An hour (symbol: h; also abbreviated hr) is a unit of time historically reckoned as  of a day and defined contemporarily as exactly 3,600 seconds (SI). There are 60 minutes in an hour, and 24 hours in a day.

Such seasonal hours, also known as temporal hours or unequal hours, varied by season and latitude.

Since this unit was not constant due to long term variations in the Earth's rotation, the hour was finally separated from the Earth's rotation and defined in terms of the atomic or physical second.

In the modern metric system, hours are an accepted unit of time defined as 3,600 atomic seconds. However, on rare occasions an hour may incorporate a positive or negative leap second, effectively making it appear to last 3,599 or 3,601 seconds, in order to keep UTC within 0.9 seconds of UT1, the latter of which is based on measurements of the mean solar day.

Name
Hour is a development of the Anglo-Norman  and Middle English , first attested in the 13th century.

It displaced tide tīd, "time" and stound stund, span of time.

The time of day is typically expressed in English in terms of hours. Whole hours on a 12-hour clock are expressed using the contracted phrase o'clock, from the older of the clock. (10 am and 10 pm are both read as "ten o'clock".)

Hours on a 24-hour clock ("military time") are expressed as "hundred" or "hundred hours". (1000 is read "ten hundred" or "ten hundred hours"; 10 pm would be "twenty-two hundred".)

Fifteen and thirty minutes past the hour is expressed as "a quarter past" or "after" and "half past", respectively, from their fraction of the hour. Fifteen minutes before the hour may be expressed as "a quarter to", "of", "till", or "before" the hour. (9:45 may be read "nine forty-five" or "a quarter till ten".)

History

Antiquity

The ancient Greeks kept time differently from the way we do today. Instead of dividing the time between one midnight and the next into 24 equal hours, they divided the time from sunrise to sunset into 12 "seasonal hours" (their actual duration depending on season), and the time from sunset to the next sunrise again in 12 "seasonal hours". Initially, only the day was divided into 12 seasonal hours and the night into three or four night watches.

By the Hellenistic period the night was also divided into 12 hours. The day-and-night was probably first divided into twenty-four hours by Hipparchus of Nicaea. The Greek astronomer Andronicus of Cyrrhus oversaw the construction of a horologion called the Tower of the Winds in Athens during the first century BCE. This structure tracked a 24-hour day using both sundials and mechanical hour indicators.

The canonical hours were introduced to early Christianity  from Second Temple Judaism.
By AD 60, the Didache recommends disciples to pray the Lord's Prayer three times a day; this practice found its way into the canonical hours as well. By the second and third centuries, such Church Fathers as Clement of Alexandria, Origen, and Tertullian wrote of the practice of Morning and Evening Prayer, and of the prayers at the third, sixth and ninth hours.
In the early church, during the night before every feast, a vigil was kept. The word "Vigils", at first applied to the Night Office, comes from a Latin source, namely the Vigiliae or nocturnal watches or guards of the soldiers. The night from six o'clock in the evening to six o'clock in the morning was divided into four watches or vigils of three hours each, the first, the second, the third, and the fourth vigil.

The Horae were originally personifications of seasonal aspects of nature, not of the time of day.
The list of twelve Horae representing the twelve hours of the day is recorded only in Late Antiquity, by Nonnus. The first and twelfth of the Horae were added to the original set of ten:

 Auge (first light)
 Anatole (sunrise)
 Mousike (morning hour of music and study)
 Gymnastike (morning hour of exercise)
 Nymphe (morning hour of ablutions)
 Mesembria (noon)
 Sponde (libations poured after lunch)
 Elete (prayer)
 Akte (eating and pleasure)
 Hesperis (start of evening)
 Dysis (sunset)
 Arktos (night sky)

Middle Ages

Medieval astronomers such as al-Biruni and Sacrobosco,   divided the hour into 60 minutes, each of 60 seconds; this derives from Babylonian astronomy, where the corresponding terms denoted the time required for the Sun's apparent motion through the ecliptic to describe one minute or second of arc, respectively. In present terms, the Babylonian degree of time was thus four minutes long, the "minute" of time was thus four seconds long and the "second" 1/15 of a second.)

In medieval Europe, the Roman hours continued to be marked on sundials but the more important units of time were the canonical hours of the Orthodox and Catholic Church. During daylight, these followed the pattern set by the three-hour bells of the Roman markets, which were succeeded by the bells of local churches. They rang prime at about 6am, terce at about 9am, sext at noon, nones at about 3pm, and vespers at either 6pm or sunset. Matins and lauds precede these irregularly in the morning hours; compline follows them irregularly before sleep; and the midnight office follows that. Vatican II ordered their reformation for the Catholic Church in 1963, though they continue to be observed in the Orthodox churches.

When mechanical clocks began to be used to show hours of daylight or nighttime, their period needed to be changed every morning and evening (for example, by changing the length of their pendula). The use of 24 hours for the entire day meant hours varied much less and the clocks needed to be adjusted only a few times a month.

Modernity

The minor irregularities of the apparent solar day were smoothed by measuring time using the mean solar day, using the Sun's movement along the celestial equator rather than along the ecliptic. The irregularities of this time system were so minor that most clocks reckoning such hours did not need adjustment. However, scientific measurements eventually became precise enough to note the effect of tidal deceleration of the Earth by the Moon, which gradually lengthens the Earth's days.

During the French Revolution, a general decimalisation of measures was enacted, including decimal time between 1794 and 1800. Mandatory use for all public records  began in 1794, but was suspended six months later by the same 1795 legislation that first established the metric system. In spite of this, a few localities continued to use decimal time for six years for civil status records, until 1800, after Napoleon's Coup of 18 Brumaire. 

The metric system bases its measurements of time upon the second, defined since 1952 in terms of the Earth's rotation in AD1900. Its hours are a secondary unit computed as precisely 3,600 seconds. However, an hour of Coordinated Universal Time (UTC), used as the basis of most civil time, has lasted 3,601 seconds 27 times since 1972 in order to keep it within 0.9 seconds of universal time, which is based on measurements of the mean solar day at 0° longitude. The addition of these seconds accommodates the very gradual slowing of the rotation of the Earth.

In modern life, the ubiquity of clocks and other timekeeping devices means that segmentation of days according to their hours is commonplace. Most forms of employment, whether wage or salaried labour, involve compensation based upon measured or expected hours worked. The fight for an eight-hour day was a part of labour movements around the world. Informal rush hours and happy hours cover the times of day when commuting slows down due to congestion or alcoholic drinks being available at discounted prices. The hour record for the greatest distance travelled by a cyclist within the span of an hour is one of cycling's greatest honours.

Counting hours

Many different ways of counting the hours have been used. Because sunrise, sunset, and, to a lesser extent, noon, are the conspicuous points in the day, starting to count at these times was, for most people in most early societies, much easier than starting at midnight. However, with accurate clocks and modern astronomical equipment (and the telegraph or similar means to transfer a time signal in a split-second), this issue is much less relevant.

Astrolabes, sundials, and astronomical clocks sometimes show the hour length and count using some of these older definitions and counting methods.

Counting from dawn 
In ancient and medieval cultures, the counting of hours generally started with sunrise. Before the widespread use of artificial light, societies were more concerned with the division between night and day, and daily routines often began when light was sufficient.

"Babylonian hours" divide the day and night into 24 equal hours, reckoned from the time of sunrise.  They are so named from the false belief of ancient authors that the Babylonians divided the day into 24 parts, beginning at sunrise.  In fact, they divided the day into 12 parts (called kaspu or "double hours") or into 60 equal parts.

Unequal hours 
Sunrise marked the beginning of the first hour, the middle of the day was at the end of the sixth hour and sunset at the end of the twelfth hour. This meant that the duration of hours varied with the season. In the Northern hemisphere, particularly in the more northerly latitudes, summer daytime hours were longer than winter daytime hours, each being one twelfth of the time between sunrise and sunset. These variable-length hours were variously known as temporal, unequal, or seasonal hours and were in use until the appearance of the mechanical clock, which furthered the adoption of equal length hours.

This is also the system used in Jewish law and frequently called "Talmudic hour" (Sha'a Zemanit) in a variety of texts. The Talmudic hour is one twelfth of time elapsed from sunrise to sunset, day hours therefore being longer than night hours in the summer; in winter they reverse.

The Indic day began at sunrise. The term hora was used to indicate an hour. The time was measured based on the length of the shadow at day time. A hora translated to 2.5 pe. There are 60 pe per day, 60 minutes per pe and 60 kshana (snap of a finger or instant) per minute. Pe was measured with a bowl with a hole placed in still water. Time taken for this graduated bowl was one pe. Kings usually had an officer in charge of this clock.

Counting from sunset 

In so-called "Italian time", "Italian hours", or "old Czech time", the first hour started with the sunset Angelus bell (or at the end of dusk, i.e., half an hour after sunset, depending on local custom and geographical latitude). The hours were numbered from 1 to 24. For example, in Lugano, the sun rose in December during the 14th hour and noon was during the 19th hour; in June the sun rose during the 7th hour and noon was in the 15th hour. Sunset was always at the end of the 24th hour. The clocks in church towers struck only from 1 to 12, thus only during night or early morning hours.

This manner of counting hours had the advantage that everyone could easily know how much time they had to finish their day's work without artificial light. It was already widely used in Italy by the 14th century and lasted until the mid-18th century; it was officially abolished in 1755, or in some regions customary until the mid-19th century.

The system of Italian hours can be seen on a number of clocks in Europe, where the dial is numbered from 1 to 24 in either Roman or Arabic numerals. The St Mark's Clock in Venice, and the Orloj in Prague are famous examples. It was also used in Poland, Silesia, and Bohemia until the 17th century.

Its replacement by the more practical division into twice twelve (equinoctial) hours (also called small clock or civic hours) began as early as the 16th  century.

An advantage of the evening counting start was that on a corresponding clock the difference to 24 was easy to see and so one knew how many hours could still be worked in Daylight.

The Islamic day begins at sunset. The first prayer of the day (maghrib) is to be performed between just after sunset and the end of twilight. Until 1968 Saudi Arabia used the system of counting 24 equal hours with the first hour starting at sunset.

Counting from noon 
For many centuries, up to 1925, astronomers counted the hours and days from noon, because it was the easiest solar event to measure accurately. An advantage of this method (used in the Julian Date system, in which a new Julian Day begins at noon) is that the date doesn't change during a single night's observing.

Counting from midnight 
In the modern 12-hour clock, counting the hours starts at midnight and restarts at noon. Hours are numbered 12, 1, 2, ..., 11. Solar noon is always close to 12 noon (ignoring artificial adjustments due to time zones and daylight saving time), differing according to the equation of time by as much as fifteen minutes either way. At the equinoxes sunrise is around 6 a.m. (before noon), and sunset around 6 p.m. (after noon).

In the modern 24-hour clock, counting the hours starts at midnight, and hours are numbered from 0 to 23. Solar noon is always close to 12:00, again differing according to the equation of time. At the equinoxes sunrise is around 06:00, and sunset around 18:00.

History of timekeeping in other cultures

Egypt

The ancient Egyptians began dividing the night into  at some time before the compilation of the Dynasty V Pyramid Texts in the 24thcenturyBC. By 2150BC (Dynasty IX), diagrams of stars inside Egyptian coffin lids—variously known as "diagonal calendars" or "star clocks"—attest that there were exactly 12 of these. Clagett writes that it is "certain" this duodecimal division of the night followed the adoption of the Egyptian civil calendar, usually placed BC on the basis of analyses of the Sothic cycle, but a lunar calendar presumably long predated this and also would have had twelve months in each of its years. The coffin diagrams show that the Egyptians took note of the heliacal risings of 36 stars or constellations (now known as "decans"), one for each of the ten-day "weeks" of their civil calendar. (12 sets of alternate "triangle decans" were used for the 5 epagomenal days between years.) Each night, the rising of eleven of these decans were noted, separating the night into twelve divisions whose middle terms would have lasted about 40minutes each. (Another seven stars were noted by the Egyptians during the twilight and predawn periods, although they were not important for the hour divisions.) The original decans used by the Egyptians would have fallen noticeably out of their proper places over a span of several centuries. These were filled to the brim at sunset and the hour determined by comparing the water level against one of its twelve gauges, one for each month of the year. During the New Kingdom, another system of decans was used, made up of 24 stars over the course of the year and 12 within any one night.

The later division of the day into 12 hours was accomplished by sundials marked with ten equal divisions. The morning and evening periods when the sundials failed to note time were observed as the first and last hours.

The Egyptian hours were closely connected both with the priesthood of the gods and with their divine services. By the New Kingdom, each hour was conceived as a specific region of the sky or underworld through which Ra's solar barge travelled. Protective deities were assigned to each and were used as the names of the hours. As the protectors and resurrectors of the sun, the goddesses of the night hours were considered to hold power over all lifespans and thus became part of Egyptian funerary rituals. The earliest forms of  include one or three stars, with the later solar hours including the determinative hieroglyph for "sun".

East Asia

Ancient China divided its day into 100 "marks"    running from midnight to midnight. The system is said to have been used since remote antiquity, credited to the legendary Yellow Emperor, but is first attested in Han-era water clocks and in the 2nd-century history of that dynasty. It was measured with sundials and water clocks. Into the Eastern Han, the Chinese measured their day schematically, adding the 20-ke difference between the solstices evenly throughout the year, one every nine days. During the night, time was more commonly reckoned during the night by the "watches"    of the guard, which were reckoned as a fifth of the time from sunset to sunrise.

Imperial China continued to use ke and geng but also began to divide the day into 12 "double hours"      named after the earthly branches and sometimes also known by the name of the corresponding animal of the Chinese zodiac. The first shi originally ran from 11pm to 1am but was reckoned as starting at midnight by the time of the History of Song, compiled during the early Yuan. These apparently began to be used during the Eastern Han that preceded the Three Kingdoms era, but the sections that would have covered them are missing from their official histories; they first appear in official use in the Tang-era Book of Sui. Variations of all these units were subsequently adopted by Japan and the other countries of the Sinosphere.

The 12 shi supposedly began to be divided into 24 hours under the Tang, although they are first attested in the Ming-era Book of Yuan. In that work, the hours were known by the same earthly branches as the shi, with the first half noted as its "starting" and the second as "completed" or "proper" shi. In modern China, these are instead simply numbered and described as "little shi". The modern ke is now used to count quarter-hours, rather than a separate unit.

As with the Egyptian night and daytime hours, the division of the day into twelve shi has been credited to the example set by the rough number of lunar cycles in a solar year, although the 12-year Jovian orbital cycle was more important to traditional Chinese and Babylonian reckoning of the zodiac.

Southeast Asia

In Thailand, Laos, and Cambodia, the traditional system of noting hours is the six-hour clock. This reckons each of a day's 24 hours apart from noon as part of a fourth of the day. The first hour of the first half of daytime was 7 am; 1 pm the first hour of the latter half of daytime; 7 pm the first hour of the first half of nighttime; and 1 am the first hour of the latter half of nighttime. This system existed in the Ayutthaya Kingdom, deriving its current phrasing from the practice of publicly announcing the daytime hours with a gong and the nighttime hours with a drum. It was abolished in Laos and Cambodia during their French occupation and is uncommon there now. The Thai system remains in informal use in the form codified in 1901 by King Chulalongkorn.

India

The Vedas and Puranas employed units of time based on the sidereal day (nakṣatra ahorātra). This was variously divided into 30 muhūrta-s of 48 minutes each or 60 dandas or nadī-s of 24 minutes each. The solar day was later similarly divided into 60 ghaṭikás of about the same duration, each divided in turn into 60 vinadis. The Sinhalese followed a similar system but called their sixtieth of a day a peya.

Derived measures
 air changes per hour (ACH), a measure of the replacements of air within a defined space used for indoor air quality
 ampere hour (Ah), a measure of electrical charge used in electrochemistry
 BTU-hour, a measure of power used in the power industry and for air conditioners and heaters
 credit hour, a measure of an academic course's contracted instructional time per week for a semester
 horsepower-hour (hph), a measure of energy used in the railroad industry
 hour angle, a measure of the angle between the meridian plane and the hour circle passing through a certain point used in the equatorial coordinate system
 kilometres per hour (km/h), a measure of land speed
 kilowatt-hour (kWh), a measure of energy commonly used as an electrical billing unit
 knot (kn), a measure of nautical miles per hour, used for maritime and aerial speed
 man-hour, the amount of work performed by the average worker in one hour, used in productivity analysis
 metre per hour (m/h), a measure of slow speeds
 mile per hour (mph), a measure of land speed
 passengers per hour per direction (p/h/d), a measure of the capacity of public transportation systems
 pound per hour (PPH), a measure of mass flow used for engines' fuel flow
 work or working hour, a measure of working time used in various regulations, such as those distinguishing part- and full-time employment and those limiting truck drivers' working hours or hours of service

See also
 Danna
 Decimal hour or deciday, a French Revolutionary unit lasting 2h 24min
 Equinoctial hours
 Golden Hour & Blue Hour in photography
 Hexadecimal hour, a proposed unit lasting 1h 30min
 Horae, the deified hours of ancient Greece and Rome
 Horology
 Julian day
 Liturgy of the Hours
 Metric time
 Temporal hours

Explanatory notes

Citations

General and cited references

Further reading
 
 Christopher Walker (ed.), Astronomy before the Telescope. London: British Museum Press, 1996.

External links 

 World time zones
 Accurate time vs. PC Clock Difference

Orders of magnitude (time)
Units of time